Medveđa is a municipality in Serbia.

It may also refer to:
 Medveđa (Despotovac), a village in Serbia
 Medveđa (Trstenik), a village in Serbia